Xiao County or Xiaoxian is a county in the north of Anhui Province, China, bordering the provinces of Jiangsu to the north and northeast and Henan to the west. It is under the administration of the prefecture-level city of Suzhou. It was formerly part of Jiangsu province, under the administration of Xuzhou. It became part of Anhui province in 1950.

Administrative divisions
In the present, Xiao County has 18 towns and 5 townships.
18 Towns

5 Townships

Climate

References

County-level divisions of Anhui
Suzhou, Anhui